Lassana is a given name or surname that is an alternative transliteration of Al-Hassan, and may refer to:

 Lassana Diarra (born 1985), French footballer of Malian descent
 Lassana Traoré (born 1945), Malian political figure 
 Lassana Fané (born 1987), Malian football player 
 Lassana Camará (born 1991), Portuguese footballer of Guinea-Bissau descent
 Lassana Diallo (born 1984), Malian football player 
 Lassana Bathily (born 1990), hero of Porte de Vincennes hostage crisis

See also
 Alassane

African given names
Masculine given names